Deuterium–tritium fusion (sometimes abbreviated D+T) is a type of nuclear fusion in which one deuterium nucleus fuses with one tritium nucleus, giving one helium nucleus, one free neutron, and 17.6 MeV of energy. It is the most efficient type of fusion for fusion devices.

Tritium, one of the reactants required for this type of fusion, is radioactive. In fusion reactors, a 'breeding blanket' made of lithium is placed on the walls of the reactor, as lithium, when exposed to energetic neutrons, will produce tritium.

Concept
In deuterium–tritium fusion, one deuterium nucleus fuses with one tritium nucleus, yielding one helium nucleus, a free neutron, and 17.6 MeV, which is derived from approximately 0.02 AMUs. The amount of energy obtained is described by the mass-energy relation: .
80% of the energy (14.1 MeV) becomes kinetic energy of the neutron traveling at ⅙ the speed of light.

Reactant sourcing
About 1 in every 5,000 hydrogen atoms in seawater is deuterium, making it easy to acquire. 

Tritium, however, is a radioactive isotope, and difficult to source naturally. This can be circumvented by exposing the more readily available lithium to energetic neutrons, which produces tritium nuclei. In addition, the deuterium–tritium reaction itself emits a free neutron, which can be used to bombard lithium. A 'breeding blanket', which consists of lithium, is often placed along the walls of fusion reactors such that free neutrons created during deuterium–tritium fusion react with it to produce more tritium. This process is called tritium breeding. Tritium can also be sourced along with deuterium from heavy water (deuterium oxide).

Use in fusion reactors
Deuterium–tritium fusion is planned to be used in ITER. It provides many advantages over other types of fusion, as it has a relatively low minimum temperature of 100 million degrees C.

See also
 Fusion power#Deuterium, tritium
 Deuterium fusion

References

Nuclear fusion reactions
Hydrogen technologies